Craigend may refer to:

 Craigend, Angus, Scotland, United Kingdom
 Craigend, Glasgow, Scotland, United Kingdom
 Craigend, Scottish Borders, Scotland, United Kingdom
 Craigend, Stirling, Scotland, United Kingdom

See also
Craigend Castle, East Dunbartonshire, Scotland
Craigends, Renfrewshire, Scotland